Narghat Assembly constituency was an assembly constituency in Purba Medinipur district in the Indian state of West Bengal.

Overview
As a consequence of the orders of the Delimitation Commission, Narghat Assembly constituency ceases to exist from 2011.

It was part of Tamluk (Lok Sabha constituency).

Members of Legislative Assembly

Results

2006

 
  

.# Swing calculated on Trinamool Congress+BJP vote percentages taken together in 2006.

1977-2006
In the 2006, 2001, 1996, and 1991 state assembly elections, Brahmamay Nanda of West Bengal Socialist Party (contested on CPI(M) symbol in 1996 and 1991) won the 207 Narghat assembly seat defeating his nearest rivals Amiya Kanti Bhattacharya of Trinamool Congress in 2006 and 2001, Suvendu Kumar Bej of Congress in 1996, and Swades Kumar Manna of Congress in 1991. Bankim Behari Maity, Independent/ Janata Party, defeated Suvendu Bej of Congress in 1987, Swadesh Kumar Manna, Independent in 1982 and Saradindu Samanta of Congress in 1977.

1967-1972
Saradindu Samanta of Congress won in 1972. Bankim Behary Maity of Bangla Congress won in 1971. Subodh Chandra Maity of Congress won in 1969. P.K.Gayen of Bangla Congress won in 1967. Prior to that the Narghat seat did not exist.

References

Former assembly constituencies of West Bengal
Politics of Purba Medinipur district